Dorsey House may refer to:

in the United States (by state then city)
D. A. Dorsey House, Miami, Florida, listed on the National Register of Historic Places (NRHP)
Holliday-Dorsey-Fife House, Fayetteville, Georgia, NRHP-listed in Fayette County
Crawford-Dorsey House and Cemetery, Lovejoy, Georgia, NRHP-listed in Clayton County
Thomas A. Dorsey Farmhouse, Carlisle, Kentucky, NRHP-listed in Nicholas County
Dorsey Hall, Columbia, Maryland, NRHP-listed
Dorsey-Palmer House, Hagerstown, Maryland, NRHP-listed
Dorsey–Jones House, Northampton, Massachusetts, NRHP-listed
Dorsey Mansion, Abbott, New Mexico, NRHP-listed
Joseph Dorsey House, West Brownsville, Pennsylvania, NRHP-listed in Washington County
Brown-Dorsey House, Midland, Texas, listed on the National Register of Historic Places listings in Midland County

See also
Dorsey Building, Lima, Ohio, NRHP-listed in Allen County